Bernard Lech (born 5 October 1946) is a French former professional footballer who played as a midfielder.

References

External links

Living people
1946 births
Sportspeople from Pas-de-Calais
French footballers
Footballers from Hauts-de-France
Association football midfielders
Ligue 1 players
Ligue 2 players
RC Lens players
AS Nancy Lorraine players
Stade de Reims players
Angers SCO players
Paris FC players